Wu Haoran (born 18 January 1994 in Heze) is a Chinese footballer who currently plays as a defender for Zibo Qisheng in China League Two.

Club career
Wu Haoran started his professional football career in 2011 when he joined Shandong Youth for the 2011 China League Two campaign. In August 2013, he was loaned to Campeonato de Portugal side Loures for one season. Failing to join Shandong Luneng Taishan First team, he transferred to another Chinese Super League club Shijiazhuang Ever Bright in February 2015. On 12 August 2015, Wu made his debut for Shijiazhuang in the 2015 Chinese Super League against Tianjin Teda, coming on as a substitute for Lü Hongchen in the 70th minute.

Career statistics 
Statistics accurate as of match played 31 December 2019.

References

External links
 

1994 births
Living people
People from Heze
Chinese footballers
Footballers from Shandong
GS Loures players
Cangzhou Mighty Lions F.C. players
Chinese Super League players
China League One players
China League Two players
Association football defenders
Chinese expatriate footballers
Expatriate footballers in Portugal
Chinese expatriate sportspeople in Portugal